Gene-environment interplay, also known as nature-nurture interplay, is a term encompassing multiple ways that genes and environments work together to produce phenotypic traits. Processes classified as examples of gene-environment interplay include gene-environment interaction, gene-environment correlation, and epigenetics,. It is often studied with behavioral genetic research designs like twin, family, and adoption studies.

Aim 

The aim of studying gene-environment interplay is to discover new mechanisms of disease and to describe the reasons for digression from the expected expression of disease. Studying these interactions allows for the complete understanding of diseases that are inclusive of numerous discrete and interacting pathways. By better understanding the etiology of such diseases, interventions can be designed to target individual factors within specific populations that minimize the prevalence of disease.

Types 
Gene-environment interplay may be complementary or antagonistic. Complementary interactions refer to both environmental exposure and genetic predisposition affecting disease risk in the same manner (ie. both increasing or decreasing). An example is atherosclerosis, which is a multifactorial disease, influenced by both genetic and environmental factors. The allele for the familial hypercholesterolemia (FH) gene increases the risk of atherosclerosis by enhancing the build-up of low-density lipoprotein cholesterol. Large intakes of saturated fats also lend themselves to increasing low-density lipoprotein cholesterol levels. Both complementary elements act to augment atherosclerosis susceptibility. Antagonistic interactions are when the two factors are opposing (ie. one increases risk, while the other decreases it). An example is hypertension. Hypertension susceptibility is increased through the presence of known risk alleles, while consistent physical activity acts as an antagonist to decrease the likelihood of developing hypertension.

Environmental factors

Pollutants 
Epigenetic modifications, such as methylation, phosphorylation, acetylation, and ubiquitylation, can affect gene activity. Decreased DNA methylation is thought to be linked to air pollution exposure. The mechanism behind this is not completely understood, but it may involve the formation of reactive oxygen species. These species generate oxidative stress, which stimulates downstream signalling. This can lead to hydroxymethylation, which replaces the methyl group with a hydroxyl group. Hydroxymethylation alters gene expression, potentially causing diseases such as lung cancer. Air pollution can also decrease expression of DNA methyltransferases, which would decrease overall DNA methylation. This can ultimately lead to inflammation in regions such as the airways, which triggers asthma. Pathways can also be activated to increase cytokine expression and immune cells in the same regions.

Malnutrition 
Nutrition can affect gene expression, thereby altering phenotype. Fetal starvation has been linked to decreased DNA methylation levels, particularly on the imprinted IGF2 loci associated with insulin metabolism. This can increase the risk for metabolic disorders and type II diabetes mellitus. Studies on prenatal exposure to famine have discovered that malnutrition causes differential DNA methylation of genes associated with growth, development and metabolism, increasing the risk of adverse phenotypes such as obesity and high cholesterol later in life.

Exercise 
Physical activity increases telomerase activity and induces epigenetic modifications of specific genes. For example, it has been shown to increase methylation of the ASC gene, which generally decreases with age, reducing the expression of pro-inflammatory cytokines. This suppression can help prevent the development of chronic inflammation and associated age-related diseases due to excess inflammatory cytokines. However, these epigenetic modifications depend on the intensity and type of exercise and are reversible with the cessation of physical activity.

Studying gene-environment interplay

Adoption and twin studies 
Adoption and twin studies have been critical in revealing the interplay between genotype and environment. These studies have contributed to studies of behaviour, personality, and psychiatric illnesses. A Finnish adoption study on schizophrenia revealed that a healthy environment can mitigate the effects of genetics in adopted individuals born to schizophrenic mothers. Criminal and antisocial behaviour have also been found to be influenced by both genetic and environmental factors through these types of studies.

Medical conditions  
Gene-environment interplay has been found to play a part in the majority of diseases. For instance, gene-environment interactions have a prevalent role in mental health disorders; specifically, evidence has found a link to alcohol dependence, schizophrenia and psychosis. There is a common polymorphism in the AKT1 gene that causes its carriers to be more sensitive to developing psychosis with consistent cannabis use. Evidence also supports gene-environment interplay to be connected to cardiovascular and metabolic conditions. These include roles in obesity, pulmonary disease and diabetes. The rise in the incidence of diabetes is suggested to be linked to interactions between the FTO or KCNQ1 genes and environmental factors.

References 

Genetics terms